Gary Adler is an American composer and musical director based in New York. He received two 2005 Drama Desk nominations (along with Michael Patrick Walker) for his music and lyrics for the off-Broadway show Altar Boyz, which had its premiere in the New York Musical Theatre Festival the year before. As a composer, Adler has written songs for Disney Channel's Johnny and the Sprites and Dance Dance Revolution, which was presented by Les Freres Corbusier in December 2008. Mr. Adler is a graduate of the University of Michigan where he studied under William Bolcom

Gary has served as the musical director for numerous shows, most notably Avenue Q. His other NYC conducting credits include Chita Rivera: The Dancer's Life, Urinetown, The Fantasticks and Nunsense.

Notes

American male composers
21st-century American composers
Music directors
Living people
University of Michigan School of Music, Theatre & Dance alumni
21st-century American male musicians
Year of birth missing (living people)